is a former Japanese football player and manager. He played for Japan national team.

Club career
Echigo was born in Mie District, Mie on December 28, 1965. After graduating from high school, he joined Furukawa Electric (later JEF United Ichihara) in 1984. The club won 1985–86 Japan Soccer League and 1986 JSL Cup. In Asia, the club won 1986 Asian Club Championship. This is first Asian champions as Japanese club. In 1995, he moved to Brummell Sendai (later Vegalta Sendai). He retired in 1999.

National team career
On July 25, 1986, Echigo debuted for Japan national team against Syria. He also played at 1986 Asian Games. In 1987, he was selected Japan for 1988 Summer Olympics qualification. He played 6 games and scored 1 goal for Japan until 1987.

Coaching career
After retirement, Echigo started coaching career at Vegalta Sendai in 2000. He served as a coach until 2004. In 2007, he signed with JEF United Chiba and became a manager for Reserve team. In 2011, he moved to Vegalta Sendai and served as manager for youth team. In 2017, he became a manager for Mynavi Vegalta Sendai Ladies. In 2017 season, the club was finished at 4th place. However in 2018 season, the club won only 1 match in 9 matches and he resigned in June.

Echigo was appointed as the manager of Chinese Taipei women's national football team on January 19, 2019, and in 2022 AFC Women's Asian Cup almost led the team to its first world cup since 1991.

Club statistics

National team statistics

References

External links

Japan National Football Team Database

1965 births
Living people
Association football people from Mie Prefecture
Japanese footballers
Japan international footballers
Japan Soccer League players
J1 League players
J2 League players
Japan Football League (1992–1998) players
JEF United Chiba players
Vegalta Sendai players
Japanese football managers
Chinese Taipei women's national football team managers
Footballers at the 1986 Asian Games
Association football midfielders
Asian Games competitors for Japan